Austrodecidae is a family of sea spiders. Austrodecidaes tend to be small measuring only 1–2 mm. This family is polyphyletic and will be split into two groups.

References
 PycnoBase: World list of Pycnogonida

Pycnogonids
Chelicerate families